Zagorny is a rural locality (a settlement) in Gubkinsky District, Belgorod Oblast, Russia. The population was 2 as of 2010.

Geography 
Zagorny is located 25 km southeast of Gubkin (the district's administrative centre) by road. Zapovedny is the nearest rural locality.

References 

Rural localities in Gubkinsky District